Great Expectations is a 1998 American romantic drama film. A contemporary film adaptation of Charles Dickens’s 1861 novel of the same name, co-written and directed by Alfonso Cuarón and starring Ethan Hawke, Gwyneth Paltrow, Hank Azaria, Robert De Niro, Anne Bancroft and Chris Cooper. It is known for having moved the setting of the original novel from 1812-1827 London to 1990s New York. The film is an abridged modernization of Dickens's 1861 novel, with the hero's name having been changed from Pip to Finn, and the characters of Miss Havisham having been renamed Nora Dinsmoor and Abel Magwitch being renamed to Arthur Lustig. The film received mixed reviews.

Plot
Ten-year-old Finnegan "Finn" Bell, an orphan being raised by his elder sister Maggie and her boyfriend Joe, is overpowered by an escaped convict while playing on a beach on the Gulf Coast. Finn brings him food, alcohol and bolt cutters to get the iron shackles off his leg, and is taken hostage. The convict tries to escape to Mexico but the police seize his small boat. The convict hides on a buoy and the police tow Finn back to land. Finn sees on the news that the now recaptured convict was mobster Arthur Lustig who had escaped from death row.

Joe is called to do gardening at "Paradiso Perduto" ("Lost Paradise" in Italian), the mansion of the richest woman in Florida, Nora Dinsmoor, who has lived as a recluse since her fiancé left her at the altar years before. Finn accompanies Joe and encounters Dinsmoor's young niece, the beautiful Estella. Dinsmoor invites Finn to come back and play with Estella. She behaves haughtily on Finn's first visit, but her aunt forces her to sit for an impromptu portrait by Finn. Dinsmoor warns Finn that he will fall in love with Estella and have his heart broken.

Several years pass. Maggie runs away from home and Joe raises Finn alone. Finn goes to Paradiso Perduto every Saturday and develops into a talented painter. Although Estella is at times flirtatious, even attempting to seduce Finn at one point, she leaves to study in Europe without telling him. Heartbroken, Finn gives up painting and his visits to Paradiso Perduto.

Seven years later, a lawyer tells Finn that a gallery owner in New York City wants to show his work. Finn is perplexed but agrees to go. There he encounters Estella in the park. She is in a relationship with a wealthy businessman, Walter. She resumes her flirtatious behavior towards Finn, posing nude in his apartment and arousing Walter's jealousy.

Eventually Finn, frustrated by Estella's evasiveness, lures her away from Walter and the two have sex. She tells him she is going to visit her aunt briefly, but will be back for the opening of Finn's show. But on opening night she fails to show up. But Uncle Joe does, and inadvertently embarrasses Finn with his crudeness. Finn goes to Estella's abode in New York, hoping to find her, but instead finds Ms. Dinsmoor, who reveals that she came to New York to attend Estella's wedding to Walter, which upsets Finn. She then tells him that Estella was using him to make Walter jealous and convince him to marry her. When she realizes how seriously she has upset him, she is remorseful and apologizes for her manipulation, but it is too late.

Back at his studio, Finn finds a strange bearded man wanting to see him. It is Arthur Lustig! Finn is first incredulous, then uncomfortable with his presence. As Lustig leaves, his comments make Finn realize that he, not the wealthy Ms. Dinsmoor, has in fact been Finn's benefactor during Finn's entire time in New York. Finn goes with him to the subway station.

Waiting for a train, Lustig sees three unsavory acquaintances on the opposite platform. Finn and Lustig outmaneuver them and get on a train. They think they are safe, but one of them comes through the car and brutally stabs Lustig. As he bleeds to death in Finn's arms, he reveals that he has been Finn's benefactor in return for the kindness Finn showed him as a child.

Devastated, Finn drops everything, goes to Paris to study art, and becomes successful. He returns to Florida to visit his Uncle Joe. Ms. Dinsmoor has died, but he visits her house anyway. Sitting in the garden, he thinks he sees an apparition of Estella as a child. Following the little girl through to the back dock, he finds her mother, who turns out to be Estella, now divorced. She admits she has often thought of him, and asks him to forgive her, which he does. They hold hands looking out over the sea.

Cast
 Ethan Hawke as Finnegan "Finn" Bell
 Jeremy James Kissner as 10-year-old Finn
 Gwyneth Paltrow as Estella
 Raquel Beaudene as 10-year-old Estella
 Chris Cooper as Joe Coleman
 Hank Azaria as Walter Plane
 Anne Bancroft as Ms. Nora Dinsmoor
 Robert DeNiro as Arthur Lustig
 Josh Mostel as Jerry Ragno
 Kim Dickens as Maggie
 Nell Campbell as Erica Thrall
 Gabriel Mann as Owen
 Stephen Spinella as Carter Macleish

Locations used
 Ca' d'Zan, an historic residence in Sarasota, Florida, was used for the exterior and parts of the interior of Paradiso Perduto. The mansion was built in 1924 by Mable and John Ringling. The façade was dressed to appear decrepit and overgrown, a gate was added to the avenue approaching the front, and the interior ballroom and loggia facing the waterfront terrace were also dressed for the dancing scenes.
 Bradenton, Florida - Cortez Road and Sarasota Bay - was used for the approach and gardens of Paradiso Perduto.
 Hempstead House on Long Island, NY was used for the interior fountain court of Paradiso Perduto.
 The Harry F. Sinclair House at East 79th St. and 5th Avenue in Manhattan acted as the exterior for Ms. Dinsmoor's New York mansion.

Production
Director Alfonso Cuarón was a big fan of Ethan Hawke's work in Before Sunrise (1995) and strongly wanted him to play the lead.
Hawke was initially not interested - he felt that the themes of class present in the story would be better served in an American context if the main character was Latino or African American. However, after meeting with Cuarón and being impressed with the director's enthusiasm for the project, Hawke agreed.

The voiceovers were not in the original screenplay. Once the film was edited together, producer Art Linson felt voiceover was needed to maintain connective tissue in the hyperstylized world Cuaron had created. Having previously worked with screenwriter David Mamet on The Edge and The Untouchables, Linson hired him to write the voiceovers. Mamet was not credited in the final film.

The name of Hawke's character was undecided for a while, with the original novel's Pip sounding unpalatable given this version's modern day setting. The production later settled on Finnegan, or Finn, the name of Hawke's dog.

Soundtrack
The song "Siren" was written for this film by Tori Amos. The soundtrack also includes songs by popular artists such as Pulp, Scott Weiland, Iggy Pop, Chris Cornell and The Verve Pipe. Duncan Sheik's contribution, the song "Wishful Thinking", was released as a single from the soundtrack and Poe's "Today" was released as a promo. The film's score was written by Scottish composer Patrick Doyle, a veteran of many literary adaptations and frequent collaborator of Kenneth Branagh, and featured classical guitarist John Williams.

Several variations of the song Bésame Mucho are heard throughout the film. The primary recording, however, and the version released on the soundtrack, is performed by Cesaria Evora.

The soundtrack also featured the breakthrough single "Life in Mono", which became a major hit, charting on the Billboard Hot 100.

The score track "Kissing in the Rain" was sampled in the song "RoboCop" on Kanye West's 2008 album, 808s & Heartbreak.

Finn (Intro) - Instrumental Vocalization by Tori Amos
Siren - Performed by Tori Amos
Life in Mono - Performed by Mono
Sunshower - Performed by Chris Cornell
Resignation - Performed by Reef
Like a Friend - Performed by Pulp
Wishful Thinking - Performed by Duncan Sheik
Today - Performed by Poe
Lady, Your Roof Brings Me Down - Performed by Scott Weiland
 Her Ornament - Performed by the Verve Pipe
Walk This Earth Alone - Performed by Lauren Christy
Breakable - Performed by Fisher
Success - Performed by Iggy Pop
Slave - Performed by David Garza
Uncle John's Band - Performed by the Grateful Dead
Besame Mucho - Performed by Cesária Évora

Novelization
A novelization of the film was written by Deborah Chiel, and published by St. Martin's Press.

Reception
Great Expectations received mixed or average reviews. Based on 24 critic reviews from mainstream publication, Metacritic assigned the film a weighted average score of 75 out of 100, based on reviews from 24 critics. Rotten Tomatoes gives the film a score of 79% based on 36 reviews. The site's consensus states: "Great Expectations is all tension: beautiful people shot in beautiful locations with lots of depth and emotion."

Film critic Roger Ebert, giving it three stars out of four, wrote: "Great Expectations begins as a great movie (I was spellbound by the first 30 minutes), but ends as only a good one, and I think that's because the screenplay, by Mitch Glazer, too closely follows the romantic line."

Ethan Hawke commented on the film's release that it had the bad fortune to overlap with the release of Titanic, which premiered in theatres six weeks before Great Expectations. He stated that "nobody gave a shit about anything but Titanic for about 9 months after...particularly another romance."

Audiences polled by CinemaScore gave the film an average grade of "A-“ on an A+ to F scale.

In 2016 at the Tribeca Film Festival, in a discussion about their collaborations, Cuaron and cinematographer Emmanuel Lubezki both stated their dissatisfaction with the film. Cuaron called it "a complete failed film" while Lubezki said it was “the least satisfying of our movies.”

Artwork and portraits used in the film
All of Finn's artwork and portraits of the main characters in the film were done by Francesco Clemente, an Italian painter. The actors sat for him in private. A gallery of some of the paintings is available for viewing at Fox's website devoted to the film.

References

External links

 
 
 
 
 
 
 Great Expectations soundtrack review at AllMusic

1998 films
1998 romantic drama films
20th Century Fox films
American romantic drama films
1990s French-language films
Films based on Great Expectations
Films directed by Alfonso Cuarón
Films produced by Art Linson
Films scored by Patrick Doyle
Films set in Florida
Films set in New York City
Films shot in Florida
Films shot in New York City
Films with screenplays by Mitch Glazer
1990s English-language films
1990s American films